The Clarkson Golden Knights men's ice hockey team is a National Collegiate Athletic Association (NCAA) Division I college ice hockey program that represents Clarkson University. The Golden Knights have been a member of ECAC Hockey since 1962, and play their home games at Cheel Arena in Potsdam, New York. While Clarkson lore has it that their first hockey game was played in 1916 against the Hogansburg Indians, the team was established as a hockey club in 1921, led by captain Bill Johnson. The Knights won their opening encounter against Alexandria Bay, 6–4, and finished the year with a 2–1 record, their first of many winning seasons.

History

Early Years
Clarkson College of Technology started its hockey team in 1921, only 25 years after the school's founding. The program played as a minor sport until the mid 1930s but routinely finished with winning records. In 1937–38 The Golden Knights completed a 13–1–1 record and were named the US Intercollegiate champions. A year later the University opened its first indoor rink, the Clarkson Arena, which would serve the college until 1991. The program took a slight downturn in the 1940s and then suspended operations for two years due to the outbreak of World War II but returned to the ice the year after the war ended. When The first college hockey tournament began in 1947 Clarkson was in the running for selection but was beaten out for the two eastern slots. Three years and one coaching change later, Clarkson College became a founding member of the first college ice hockey conference, the Tri-State League. The Golden Knights not only won the conference with a 4–1 record, but because they tied with Middlebury, they also participated in the first conference playoff game to determine the sole champion and were victorious. Unfortunately the team's 12–2–1 mark was still not good enough to receive an invitation to the NCAA tournament. The program continued to build until they produced a superb 23–0 record in 1956 with NCAA scoring champion Ed Rowe leading the way. 'Tech' finally received an NCAA invitation but it came with a caveat; because eight of their players were 4-year lettermen they would have to sit out the tournament for Clarkson to participate. Because of this the team voted to pass on the invitation. The Golden Knights wouldn't have to wait long for their first tournament appearance, however, as they were invited the following year and finished in third place. After a second consecutive third-place head coach Bill Harrison resigned and turned the team over to Len Ceglarski. The first few years under Ceglarski saw the team's record dip slightly but stating in his third season the Golden Knights became a constant power in college hockey.

ECAC Powerhouse
Clarkson was one of 28 founding members of the ECAC in 1961 and finished in second place both in the conference and the ECAC tournament. Clarkson was invited to the NCAA tournament, boasting the top offense in the nation and used its firepower to down Michigan in the semifinal but couldn't repeat the performance in the title match and fell to Michigan Tech 1–7. Clarkson made the tournament the following year but finished with its third #3 finish. In 1966 Clarkson posted a superb season, winning the ICAC and ECAC crowns before taking its first ECAC Tournament. In the tournament Clarkson faced relatively weak opponents (the 4th- and 6th-place teams from the WCHA) and though they managed to win their semifinal matchup, they couldn't take advantage in the title tilt and fell to Michigan State 1–6. Tech continued to play well over the next few years but would not return to the NCAA tournament until 1970. After defeating the top western team in the semifinal, Clarkson faced off against the undefeated Cornell Big Red and fought tooth and nail for their first championship. The game was tied after both the first and second period with the Golden Knights having taken the lead twice on the strength of Bruce Bullock's goaltending but a natural hat trick by Cornell's Dan Lodboa in the third frame put the game out of reach and Clarkson had to settle for runner-up for the third time. The following year Clarkson finished in second place for both the ECAC and their conference tournament but received a slap in the face from the selection committee when they were passed over for Boston University as the second eastern team. To add insult to injury, the Terriers went on to claim the championship that year. A year later Len Ceglarski would leave the program to take over at his alma mater Boston College, having led Clarkson to 12 consecutive seasons of at least a .600 winning percentage.

Intermittent Success

Jerry York, another BC grad, would take over in 1973 and, as it had under Ceglarski, the program's record slumped. It took four years for Tech to climb back to its lofty perch and in 1977 it did just that with future NHL all-star Dave Taylor leading the way. Clarkson finished with the best record in the ECAC and went into the postseason as one of the favorites for the national championship. Unfortunately the team hit a roadblock in the semifinal, losing to Boston University 6–7 and finished the ECAC tournament in 4th place. Once Taylor left the program dipped but still performed well. However,  in 1979 York left for greener pastures, turning the team over to Clarkson alumnus Bill O'Flaherty. In O'Flaherty's six seasons behind the bench the Golden Knights never finished with a record below .600 and captured two ECAC titles. Though Tech wouldn't win any of those ECAC tournaments, the expanded NCAA tournament allowed Clarkson to earn three at-large bids into the national tournament. The Golden Knights record in the NCAA tournament was disappointing, going 1–4–1 in three tries and losing in the first round each time. O'Flaherty would turn the team over to former NHL-er Cap Raeder in 1985 and the new coach would shepherd the team well over three seasons but it wasn't until Mark Morris took the reins in 1988 that the program would return to prominence once more.

90's Resurgence

Though Clarkson hadn't had a losing season since 1975 when Morris took over, the team had an air of underachieving about it especially when it came to postseason results. Tech proceeded to produce steadily increasing results in Morris' first three seasons, culminating with a program-record 29-win season in 1991 that also saw the Golden Knights win their first ECAC tournament since 1966. Despite the top finish Clarkson received no respect from the selection committee and was seeded 4th in the eastern bracket despite having a better record than the 2nd- and 3rd-seeded schools. Clarkson pushed past the slight and defeated defending champion Wisconsin in the first round series. In the Quarterfinals Tech took on the top western seed, Lake Superior State, and triumphed in the series 2 games to 1. The Golden Knights reached the frozen four for the first time in 21 years but the magic wore off once they did and they fell to BU 3–7. Clarkson's performance in the 1991 tournament gave them enough credibility to earn an NCAA bid despite flaming out in the ECAC tournament the following year. Similar to what they had done under Ceglarski, Clarkson never had a sub-.600 record during the entire decade, winning four ECAC titles, three conference tournaments and making the NCAA tournament nine out of ten seasons. Despite the success the Golden Knights wilted once they entered the national tournament. Aside from their semifinal run in 1991 Clarkson won only one game in eight other appearances.

Firing and Decline
Tech's record slipped with the dawn of a new millennium but Morris' teams still produced winning records. Clarkson was expected to continue this trend for years to come but in November 2002 Morris was suspended following an altercation with one of his players after a team practice. After a 10-day inquiry Morris was dismissed from the team and his assistant Fred Parker took over in the interim. The team played flat most of the rest of the season, posting the program's first losing record in almost 30 years and their worst winning percentage in over 40 seasons. Parker was replaced by George Roll they following year and after a slow start, the Golden Knights recovered and finished as runner-ups in the ECAC tournament. After two middling seasons Clarkson returned to its superior success with a 25-win season in 2007 where the team captured its fifth ECAC tournament title. After winning the regular season ECAC crown the next season Clarkson dropped in the standings, finishing the next three seasons with losing records and, in 2010, posting the program's worst season since before the second world war.

Slow Climb Back
Roll was fired in 2011 with the program at its nadir, becoming the only full-time head coach to finish his tenure at Clarkson with a losing record. His former assistant Casey Jones was eventually selected as the replacement and a slow climb out of the cellar began. It took three seasons before Tech had another winning season and wasn't until 2018 that Clarkson made an appearance in the NCAA tournament. The Golden Knights would lose in the first round that year but with four players making the ECAC all-rookie team over the previous two seasons Clarkson was well placed to improve their standing over the next few years.

Clarkson has had 36 individuals earn All-American honors since 1928, including 13 who have won the honor twice. Defenseman Fred Dion and center Buzz Williams were the first Golden Knights to receive the honor in 1928–29.

The 2020–21 season was cancelled prior to the ECAC tournament due to the team violating COVID-19 protocols.

Season-by-season results

Source:

Coaching history

As of the completion of 2021–22 season

† Mark Morris was fired in November 2002.

Awards and honors

United States Hockey Hall of Fame
Source:
Len Ceglarski (1992)

NCAA

Individual awards

Spencer Penrose Award
William Harrison: 1956
Len Ceglarski: 1966
Jerry York: 1977
Bill O'Flaherty: 1981

NCAA Division I Ice Hockey Scoring Champion
Ed Rowe: 1956
Dave Taylor: 1977

All-Americans
AHCA First Team All-Americans

1955-56: Ed Rowe, F
1956-57: Ed Rowe, F
1957-58: Eddie MacDonald, G
1962-63: Pat Brophy, D; Cal Wagner, D
1963-64: Pat Brophy, D; Corby Adams, F
1964-65: Terry Yurkiewicz, G
1965-66: Terry Yurkiewicz, G
1969-70: Bruce Bullock, G
1970-71: Bruce Bullock, G; Steve Warr, D
1971-72: Steve Warr, D
1975-76: Brian Shields, G
1976-77: Brian Shields, G; Bill Blackwood, D; Dave Taylor, F
1977-78: Bill Blackwood, D
1980-81: Don Sylvestri, G; Ed Small, D; Bryan Cleaver, F
1981-82: Steve Cruickshank, F
1982-83: Colin Patterson, F
1983-84: Bob Armstrong, D; Dave Fretz, D
1984-85: Dave Fretz, D
1993-94: Brian Mueller, D; Craig Conroy, F
1994-95: Brian Mueller, D
1996-97: Matt Pagnutti, D; Todd White, F
2000-01: Kent Huskins, D
2018-19: Nico Sturm, F

AHCA Second Team All-Americans

1955-56: Art Smith, D
1956-57: Eddie MacDonald, G
1985-86: Andy Otto, D
1987-88: John Fletcher, G; Luciano Borsato, F
1994-95: Marko Tuomainen, F
1995-96: Dan Murphy, G; Todd White, F
1996-97: Dan Murphy, G
1998-99: Willie Mitchell, D; Erik Cole, F
2006-07: Nick Dodge, F
2007-08: Grant Clitsome, D
2017-18: Kelly Summers, D; Sheldon Rempal, F
2019–20: Frank Marotte, G

ECAC Hockey

Individual awards

ECAC Hockey Player of the Year
Terry Yurkiewicz: 1966
Bruce Bullock: 1971
Dave Taylor: 1977
Ed Small: 1981
Steve Cruickshank: 1982
Todd White: 1997

ECAC Hockey Rookie of the Year
Don Sylvestri: 1981
John Fletcher: 1987
Erik Cole: 1998
Willie Mitchell: 1998
Rob McFeeters: 2001
Ethan Haider: 2021

ECAC Hockey Best Defensive Forward
Buddy Wallace: 1998
Nick Dodge: 2008
Nico Sturm: 2018, 2019
Josh Dunne: 2020
Zach Tsekos: 2021

ECAC Hockey Best Defensive Defenseman
Martin d'Orsonnens: 1993
Matt Pagnutti: 1997
Kent Huskins: 2001
James de Haas: 2017

Ken Dryden Award
David Leggio: 2007
Frank Marotte: 2020

ECAC Hockey Student-Athlete of the Year
Matt Zarbo: 2013
Zach Tsekos: 2020

Tim Taylor Award
Mark Morris: 1991, 2001

ECAC Hockey Most Outstanding Player in Tournament
Terry Yurkiewicz: 1966
Bruce Bullock: 1970
Hugo Belanger: 1991
Chris Rogles: 1993
Willie Mitchell: 1999
Chris D'Alvise: 2007

All-ECAC
First Team All-ECAC Hockey

1961–62: Cal Wagner, D; Hal Pettersen, F; Corby Adams, F
1962–63: Cal Wagner, D; Pat Brophy, D; Corby Adams, F
1963–64: Corby Adams, F
1970–71: Bruce Bullock, G; Steve Warr, D
1971–72: Steve Warr, D
1975–76: Brian Shields, G
1976–77: Brian Shields, G; Dave Taylor, F
1979–80: Mike Prestidge, F
1980–81: Don Sylvestri, G; Ed Small, D; Bryan Cleaver, F
1981–82: Steve Cruickshank, F
1983–84: Bob Armstrong, F
1984–85: Dave Fretz, D
1987–88: John Fletcher, G
1988–89: Jarmo Kekäläinen, F
1990–91: Dave Tretowicz, D
1992–93: Marko Tuomainen, F
1993–94: Brian Mueller, D; Craig Conroy, F
1994–95: Brian Mueller, D; Marko Tuomainen, F
1996–97: Matt Pagnutti, D; Todd White, F
1998–99: Willie Mitchell, D; Erik Cole, F
1999–00: Kent Huskins, D
2000–01: Kent Huskins, D
2001–02: Kerry Ellis-Toddington, D
2002–03: Randy Jones, D
2006–07: David Leggio, G; Nick Dodge, F
2007–08: Grant Clitsome, D; Steve Zalewski, F
2017–18: Kelly Summers, D; Sheldon Rempal, F
2019–20: Frank Marotte, G
2020–21: Connor McCarthy, D; Zach Tsekos, F
2021–22: Alex Campbell, F; Mathieu Gosselin, F

Second Team All-ECAC Hockey

1961–62: Wayne Gibbons, G; Pat Brophy, D; Roger Purdie, F
1962–63: Roger Purdie, F; Brian Wilkinson, F
1963–64: Roger Purdie, F; Brian Wilkinson, F
1964–65: Terry Yurkiewicz, G
1965–66: Terry Yurkiewicz, G; Gary Petterson, D; Tom Hurley, F
1967–68: John McLennan, F
1969–70: Wayne LaChance, D
1970–71: Jerry Kemp, F
1975–76: Bill Blackwood, D
1976–77: Bill Blackwood, D
1977–78: Bill Blackwood, D; Marty McNally, F; Kevin Zappia, F
1979–80: Ed Small, D; Steve Cruickshank, F
1980–81: Steve Cruickshank, F
1982–83: Dave Fretz, D; Colin Patterson, F
1987–88: Luciano Borsato, F
1989–90: Dave Tretowicz, D
1990–91: Chris Rogles, G
1991–92: Hugo Belanger, F
1992–93: Todd Marchant, F
1993–94: Jason Currie, G
1994–95: Patrice Robitaille, F
1995–96: Todd White, F
1996–97: Dan Murphy, G
1997–98: Willie Mitchell, D; Chris Clark, F
1999–00: Erik Cole, F
2000–01: Mike Walsh, G; Matt Poapst, F
2007–08: David Leggio, G
2016–17: James De Haas, D
2017–18: Terrance Amorosa, D
2018–19: Jake Kielly, G; Aaron Thow, D; Haralds Egle, F
2019–20: Connor McCarthy, D
2021–22: Noah Beck, D; Zach Tsekos, F

Third Team All-ECAC Hockey

2005–06: Nick Dodge, F
2007–08: Matt Beca, F
2011–12: Paul Karpowich, G
2015–16: James De Haas, D
2016–17: Sam Vineault, F
2017–18: Jake Kielly, G; Nico Sturm, F
2019–20: Devin Brosseau, F; Josh Dunne, F; Haralds Egle, F
2021–22: Lukas Kälble, D
2022–23: Noah Beck, D; Ayrton Martino, F; Mathieu Gosselin, F

ECAC Hockey All-Rookie Team

1987–88: Dave Tretowicz, D
1989–90: Hugo Belanger, F; Scott Thomas, F
1990–91: Ed Henrich, D; Craig Conroy, F
1991–92: Brian Mueller, D; Todd Marchant, F; Patrice Robitaille, F; Marko Tuomainen, F
1993–94: Adam Wiesel, D; Jean-Francois Houle, F
1994–95: Dan Murphy, G; Chris Clark, F
1995–96: Mikko Ollila, D
1997–98: Willie Mitchell, D; Erik Cole, F
1998–99: Shawn Grant, G; Kerry Ellis-Toddington, D
2000–01: Rob McFeeters, F
2001–02: Randy Jones, D
2005–06: Shea Guthrie, F
2012–13: Paul Geiger, D
2013–14: James de Haas, D
2014–15: Kyle Summers, D
2016–17: Jake Kielly, G; Sheldon Rempal, F; Nico Sturm, F
2017–18: Jack Jacome, F
2020–21: Ethan Haider, G
2021–22: Ayrton Martino, F

Clarkson Athletic Hall of Fame
The following is a list of people associated with Clarkson's men's ice hockey program who were elected into the Clarkson University Athletic Hall of Fame (induction date in parenthesis).

Corby Adams (1992)
Al Graham (1992)
Paul Pilon (1992)
Ed Rowe (1992)
Dave Taylor (1992)
Pinky Ryan (1992)
Wally Easton (1995)
Ron Frazer (2004)
Dave Fretz (2004)
George MacLean (2004)
John McLennan (2004)
Bob Van Lammers (2004)
Steve Warr (2004)
Bruce Bullock (2005)
Eddie MacDonald (2005)
Colin Patterson (2005)
Jack Porter (2005)
Helen Cheel (2005)
Len Ceglarski (2007)
Terry Yurkiewicz (2007)
Bob Empie (2008)
Fred Silver (2008)
Kevin Zappia (2008)
Bill Harrison (2008)
Murray Walker (2008)
Art Smith (2010)
Bill Blackwood (2012)
Craig Conroy (2012)
Tom Hurley (2012)
Frank Rotunno (2012)
Skip Demerski (2017)
Craig Laughlin (2017)
Bill Little (2017)
Don Seale (2017)

Statistical leaders

Career points leaders

Career goaltending leaders

GP = Games played; Min = Minutes played; GA = Goals against; SO = Shutouts; SV% = Save percentage; GAA = Goals against average

Minimum 20 games

Statistics current through the start of the 2020–21 season.

Players

Olympians
This is a list of Clarkson alumni were a part of an Olympic team.

Golden Knights in the NHL
As of July 1, 2022.

WHA
Three players were members of WHA teams.

Retired numbers 
7 - Craig Conroy (1990–94)
22 - Craig Laughlin (1976–80)
24 - Dave Taylor (1974–77)
25 - Colin Patterson (1980–83)

Current roster
As of August 24, 2022.

See also
Clarkson Golden Knights women's ice hockey

References

External links
Clarkson Golden Knights men's hockey
Golden Knights Hockey Roundtable Discussion Forum

 
Ice hockey teams in New York (state)